The Calw Hermann Hesse Prize is a literary prize awarded since 1990. It is named after the German-Swiss poet, novelist, and painter Hermann Hesse. The first prize is awarded for "a literary achievement of international standing in connection with its translation". The latter is intended to promote the examination of the work of the poet, who was born in Calw in 1877. In 2017, the first recipient was Adolf Muschg.

Recipients 
 1990 literary magazine: "Verwendung" – editor Egmont Hesse, Berlin
 1992 translator: , Moscow
 1994 literary magazine: "Schreibheft" – editor Norbert Wehr, Essen
 1996 translator: , Norway
 1998 literary magazine: "Am Erker" – editors Joachim Feldmann, Rudolf Gier, Michael Kofort, Münster
 2000 translator: Jean Malaplate, France
 2002 literary magazine: "EDIT", Leipzig
 2004 translator: , Peru
 2006 literary magazine: "Sprache im technischen Zeitalter" – editor Joachim Neuß
 2008 translator: , Poland
 2010 literary magazine: POET, Leipzig
 2012 translator: Susan Bernofsky, US
 2014 Nicholson Baker (US) and his translator  (Germany) (International Hermann Hesse Prize)
 2014 Honorary Award: 
 2016 Luiz Ruffato (Brazil) and his translator  (Germany) (International Hermann Hesse Prize)

 2017 Adolf Muschg (Hermann Hesse Prize of the International Hermann Hesse Society)
 2018 Joanna Bator (Poland) and her translator Esther Kinsky (Germany) (International Hermann Hesse Prize)
 2019 Eugen Drewermann (Hermann Hesse Prize of the International Hermann Hesse Society)
 2020 Chimamanda Ngozi Adichie (Nigeria and US) and her translator  (Germany) (International Hermann Hesse Prize)
 2021  (Hermann Hesse Prize of the International Hermann Hesse Society)

References

External links 
 

German literary awards
Hermann Hesse
Awards established in 1990
1990 establishments in Germany